Emleben is a municipality in the district of Gotha, in Thuringia, Germany.

Notable people
Gerald Hüther, German neurobiologist and author

References

Gotha (district)
Saxe-Coburg and Gotha